Ali Crossdale (born 9 January 1998) is an English rugby union player.

On 26 January 2021 it was announced that Crossdale would be part of the shadow squad for England at the 2021 Six Nations Championship.

References

External links
Saracens Profile
ESPN Profile
Ultimate Rugby Profile

1998 births
Living people
English rugby union players
Rugby union players from Halifax, West Yorkshire
Rugby union wings